Curvibacter gracilis is a Gram-negative bacterium from the genus Curvibacter and family Comamonadaceae, which was isolated from well water.

References

External links
Type strain of Curvibacter gracilis at BacDive -  the Bacterial Diversity Metadatabase

Burkholderiaceae
Bacteria described in 2004